Morpho cisseis, the Cisseis morpho, is a large Neotropical butterfly found in the southern and western Amazon in Bolivia, Colombia, Peru, Ecuador, and Brazil. It includes several subspecies, but has itself sometimes been treated as a subspecies of the sunset morpho. Both are highly valued by collectors.

Description
Morpho cisseis is a large butterfly with a wingspan of 147 mm and 180 mm. The upperside is blue-green gray, the outer edge is largely bordered by black and broad black band extending over two-thirds of the forewing's costal edge. The reverse is copper decorated with a line of white chevrons and black, yellow and white eyespots, three on the forewings and a very large and three more small eyespots on the hindwings.

Account in Die Gross-Schmetterlinge der Erde

Etymology
Cissei was the daughter of Cisseus, king of Thrace.

References

Le Moult, E. & Réal, P., 1962–1963. Les Morpho d'Amérique du Sud et Centrale, Editions du cabinet entomologique E. Le Moult, Paris.
Paul Smart, 1976 The Illustrated Encyclopedia of the Butterfly World in Color. London, Salamander:Encyclopedie des papillons. Lausanne, Elsevier Sequoia (French language edition)  page 230 fig.2(Brazil) page 231 ssp. phanodemus Hew., underside (Peru).

External links
 Taxonomy (subspecies)
"Species Morpho cisseis". Butterflies of America. Images of type and other specimens.
"Morpho cisseis C. & R. Felder, 1860". Insecta.pro.

Morpho
Nymphalidae of South America
Fauna of Brazil
Butterflies described in 1860
Taxa named by Baron Cajetan von Felder
Taxa named by Rudolf Felder